Byasa impediens, the pink-spotted windmill, is a species of butterfly from the family Papilionidae (swallowtails) found in Taiwan.

The wingspan is 10–11 cm. The wings are black and have large light pink spots. The underside of the wings are similar to the upside. The body is partially black with a covering of red hairs underneath.

The larva feeds on Aristolochia species.

Status
No data on conservation status; more research needed. Subspecies B. i. febanus is sometimes accepted as a separate species.

References

External links
 
 Global Butterfly Information System text, images including holotype of subspecies febanus Fruhstorfer, 1908

Butterflies described in 1895
Byasa
Butterflies of Asia